Elections to the French National Assembly were held in Gabon and French Congo on 21 October 1945, with a second round of voting on 18 November. Gabriel d'Arboussier and Jean-Félix Tchicaya were elected.

Electoral system
The two seats allocated to the constituency were elected on two separate electoral rolls; French citizens elected one MP from the first college, whilst non-citizens elected one MP in the second college.

Campaign
The election campaign was largely a contest between three large ethnic groups; the Fang of Gabon, the Mbochi in the north of Congo and the Vili from the Pointe-Noire coastal area. One other large group, the Kongo, refused to vote or wrote the name of the religious figure André Matsoua (who had died in prison in 1942) on the ballot paper.

The Fang candidate was Jean-Hilaire Aubame, whilst the Vili candidate was Jean-Félix Tchicaya.

Results

First college

Second college

Aftermath
Following the elections, Senegalese MP Lamine Guèye attempted to persuade all the African MPs to form an African Bloc, which would be affiliated with the SFIO. However, the attempt failed, and although Tchicaya did sit with the SFIO, d'Arboussier joined the MUR.

References

Gabon
October 1945 events in Africa
Elections in Gabon
Elections in the Republic of the Congo
1945 in Gabon
1945 in French Equatorial Africa
1945 elections in France